"Summertime" is a song written by Craig Wiseman and Steve McEwan and recorded by American country music artist Kenny Chesney. It was released in April 2006 as the third single from Chesney’s 2005 album The Road and the Radio. The song reached number one on the U.S. Billboard Hot Country Songs chart.

Background and writing
Co-writer Craig Wiseman told The Boot that he and McEwan had been working on "My Old Friend" for Tim McGraw until he took a break from writing and went out on the back steps of his office. Wiseman said, "It was that first night when it stays warm, and you can smell the grass growing. I walked outside and was like, 'Man ... summertime! Smell that!' It was that first warm night of summer. It was great." He also said that the next day he was driving in to write with Steve and he couldn't stop saying "Summertime!". Once he got to the office he pulled up a drumbeat and kept saying it. Wiseman said that he didn't originally want to call the song 'Summertime' because he wanted to be original, but he just kept coming back to that title.

Content
The song talks about many different activities that take place in the summer.

Music video
The music video premiered on CMT on February 8, 2007. The video was shot at various concerts, and was directed by Kenny Chesney and Shaun Silva. It was also Kenny's directorial debut.

Chart performance
"Summertime" charted for one week at number 60 on the Hot Country Songs chart dated for November 26, 2005. It re-entered at number 31 on the U.S. Billboard Hot Country Songs chart for the week of April 15, 2006. It reached number one and remained there for five consecutive weeks until it was knocked off by "The World" by Brad Paisley.

Year-end charts

Certifications

References

2006 singles
2005 songs
Kenny Chesney songs
Songs written by Craig Wiseman
Music videos directed by Shaun Silva
Songs written by Steve McEwan
Song recordings produced by Buddy Cannon
BNA Records singles